Aspergillus helicothrix is a species of fungus in the genus Aspergillus.

References

Further reading
 

helicothrix
Fungi described in 1980